Alan John Martin (13 March 1928 – 30 August 2004) was an Australian rules footballer who played with Footscray in the Victorian Football League (VFL) during the early 1950s. His last game for Footscray was in their victorious 1954 Grand Final. He then went to Golden Square, as coach.

References

External links

1928 births
Australian rules footballers from Victoria (Australia)
Western Bulldogs players
Western Bulldogs Premiership players
Golden Point Football Club players
2004 deaths
One-time VFL/AFL Premiership players